The Turkish film industry produced over one hundred feature films in 2014. This article fully lists all non-pornographic films, including short films, that had a release date in that year and which were at least partly made by Turkey. It does not include films first released in previous years that had release dates in 2014.

Major releases

See also

 2014 in film
 2014 in Turkey
 Cinema of Turkey
 List of 2014 box office number-one films in Turkey
 List of Turkish submissions for the Academy Award for Best Foreign Language Film

References

External links

Turkish
2014
Films
2014
2014 in Turkish cinema